Miroslava Cerna is a Czech paralympic archer. She won the bronze medal at the Women's team recurve event at the 2008 Summer Paralympics in Beijing.

References

Czech female archers
Living people
Paralympic bronze medalists for the Czech Republic
Paralympic archers of the Czech Republic
Archers at the 2008 Summer Paralympics
Medalists at the 2008 Summer Paralympics
Year of birth missing (living people)
Paralympic medalists in archery